Tell No One (", As not said) is a 2012 Italian comedy film, directed by Ivan Silvestrini.  It is based on a novel with the same title written by Roberto Proia.

Plot summary 
Mattia is a homosexual guy from Rome, the lover of a young Spanish student named Eduard. He cannot tell his parents about his love affair, because of their very conservative opinions and the particular situation in Rome - everyone Mattia meets in the city hates gay people, and condemns them as unclean beings.
Mattia plans to secretly run away with Eduard while telling his parents that he intends to leave Italy in order to find work.  Mattia's plan seems to work, but the troubles begin when he discovers that Eduard is coming to Italy in order to meet Mattia's parents. Given the relative liberal attitudes in Spain towards gay people, Eduard thinks that Mattia has already told his parents and his environment. Mattia tries to get along with everyone for a while, but in the end is forced to reveal his homosexuality to his parents, who understand him.
Finally, Mattia can fulfill his need for love by going to Spain with Eduard.

Cast 
Josafat Vagni: Mattia
José Dammert: Eduard
Valeria Bilello: Stefania
Francesco Montanari: Giacomo / Alba Paillettes
Monica Guerritore: Aurora
Ninni Bruschetta: Rodolfo 
Victoria Cabello: herself

Awards

See also    
 List of Italian films of 2012

References

External links

2012 films
2012 comedy films
Italian LGBT-related films
2012 LGBT-related films
Films based on Italian novels
Italian comedy films
Gay-related films
Films set in Rome
2010s Italian films